Veronica Calabrese (born 7 November 1987 in Mesagne, Brindisi) is an Italian taekwondo practitioner. She won two bronze medals for the 57 and 59 kg classes at the European Taekwondo Championships (2006 in Bonn, and 2010 in St. Petersburg). She also captured a silver medal in the same division at the 2009 World Taekwondo Championships in Copenhagen, Denmark, losing out to China's Hou Yuzhuo. Calabrese is a member of the taekwondo team for Centro Sportivo Esercito, and is coached and trained by Yoon Soon-Cheul. She is engaged to two-time Olympic medalist Mauro Sarmiento.

Calabrese qualified for the women's 57 kg class at the 2008 Summer Olympics in Beijing, after placing second from the World Qualification Tournament in Manchester, England. She defeated Colombia's Doris Patiño and Senegal's Bineta Diedhiou in the first two rounds, before losing out the semi-final match to South Korean taekwondo jin and world champion Lim Su-Jeong, with a score of 1–5. Calabrese automatically qualified for the bronze medal bout, where she narrowly lost the medal to United States' Diana López, with a sudden death score of 2–3.

References

External links

NBC Olympics Profile

Italian female taekwondo practitioners
1987 births
Living people
Olympic taekwondo practitioners of Italy
Taekwondo practitioners at the 2008 Summer Olympics
People from Mesagne
World Taekwondo Championships medalists
European Taekwondo Championships medalists
Sportspeople from the Province of Brindisi
21st-century Italian women